I wish is the second studio album by Japanese rock band Deen. It was released on 9 September 1996 under B-Gram Records. I Wish includes previous 5 released singles, since Teenage dream till Sugao de Waratteitai. Only five new tracks were included on this album. The album reached #2 in its first week and charted for 10 weeks, selling 612,000 copies.

Track listing

Personnel
 Shuuichi Ikemori – lead and backing vocals
 Shinji Tagawa – guitars
 Naoki Uzumoto – drums, percussion
 Koji Yamane – keyboards, backing vocals

References

Being Inc. albums
Japanese-language albums
1996 albums
Deen (band) albums